Joplin is a city in Jasper and Newton counties in the southwestern corner of the U.S. state of Missouri. The bulk of the city is in Jasper County, while the southern portion is in Newton County. Joplin is the largest city located within both Jasper and Newton Counties - even though it is not the county seat of either county (Carthage is the seat of Jasper County while Neosho is the seat of Newton County). With a population of 51,762 as of the 2020 census, Joplin is the 13th most-populous city in the state. The city covers an area of 35.69 square miles (92.41 km2) on the outer edge of the Ozark Mountains. Joplin is the main hub of the three-county Joplin-Miami, Missouri-Oklahoma Metro area, which is home to 210,077 people making it the 5th largest metropolitan area in Missouri. In May 2011, the city was hit by a violent EF5 tornado which destroyed one-third of the city.

History

19th century

Lead was discovered in the Joplin Creek Valley before the Civil War, but only after the war did significant development take place. By 1871, numerous mining camps sprang up in the valley and resident John C. Cox filed a plan for a city on the east side of the valley. Cox named his village Joplin City after the spring and creek nearby, which had been named for the Reverend Harris G. Joplin, who settled upon its banks circa 1840.

Carthage resident Patrick Murphy filed a plan for a city on the opposite side of the valley and named it Murphysburg. As the nearest sheriff was in Carthage, frontier lawlessness abounded in Joplin. The historic period was referred to as the "Reign of Terror". The cities eventually merged into Union City, but when the merger was found illegal, the cities split. Murphy suggested that a combined city be named Joplin. The cities merged again on March 23, 1873, this time permanently, as the City of Joplin.

While Joplin was first settled for lead mining, zinc, often referred to as "jack", was the most important mineral resource. As railroads were built to connect Joplin to major markets in other cities, it was on the verge of dramatic growth. By the start of the 20th century, the city was becoming a regional metropolis. Construction centered around Main Street, with many bars, hotels, and fine homes nearby. Joplin's three-story "House of Lords" was its most famous saloon, with a bar and restaurant on the first floor, gambling on the second, and a brothel on the third. Trolley and rail lines made Joplin the hub of southwest Missouri. As the center of the "Tri-state district", it soon became the lead- and zinc-mining capital of the world.

As a result of extensive surface and deep mining, Joplin is dotted with open-pit mines and mineshafts. Mining left many tailings piles (small hills of ground rock), which are considered unsightly locally. The main part of Joplin is nearly 75% undermined, with some mine shafts well over 100 ft (30 m) deep. These shafts have occasionally caved in, creating sinkholes.

20th century

Joplin began to add cultural amenities; in 1902, residents passed a tax to create a public library, and gained matching funds that enabled them to build the Carnegie Library. It was seen as the symbol of a thriving city. In 1930, the grand commercial Electric Theater was built, one of the many movie palaces of the time. It was later purchased and renamed the Fox by Fox Theatres corporation. With the Depression and post-World War II suburban development, moviegoing declined at such large venues.

On April 15, 1903, Joplin police officers, including Theodore Leslie, 36, were searching nearby rail yards for a Black man who had allegedly stolen pistols from a hardware store when Leslie noticed a man in one of the rail cars. Shots were fired, and Leslie, a father of four, was mortally wounded. Hundreds of men launched a search using bloodhounds. On April 16, a Black man with a weapon, Thomas Gilyard, was arrested, and while he told one of the men involved in the arrest that he had been in the box car, he said several others had been there and that one of them fired the fatal shot.
Joplin City Attorney Perl Decker pleaded with the growing mob to break up, according to newspaper and other historical accounts, as did Mayor Thomas Cunningham, but the crowd soon stormed the jail and took Gilyard from his cell. He was lynched soon afterward.

In 1933 during the Great Depression, the notorious criminals Bonnie and Clyde spent some weeks in Joplin, where they robbed several area businesses. Tipped off by a neighbor, the Joplin Police Department attempted to apprehend the pair. Bonnie and Clyde escaped after killing Newton County Constable John Wesley Harryman and Joplin Police Detective Harry McGinnis; however, they were forced to leave most of their possessions behind, including a camera. The Joplin Globe developed and printed the film, which showed now-legendary photos of Bonnie holding Clyde at mock gunpoint, and of Bonnie with her foot on a car fender, posed with a pistol in her hand and cigar in her mouth. The Missouri Advisory Council on Historic Preservation nominated the house where the couple stayed, at 34th Street and Oak Ridge Drive, for inclusion on the National Register of Historic Places on February 13, 2009.

After World War II, most of the mines were closed, and population growth leveled off. The main road through Joplin running east and west was designated as part of U.S. Route 66, which became famous as more Americans took to newly constructed highways. The roads provided improved access between cities, but they also drew off population to newer housing and eventually retail centers.

In the 1960s and 1970s, nearly 40 acres (16 ha) of the city's downtown were razed in an attempt at urban renewal, as population and businesses had moved to a suburban fringe along newly constructed highways. The Keystone Hotel and Worth Block (former home of the House of Lords) were notable historic structures that were demolished. Christman's Department Store stands (converted into loft apartments), as does the Joplin Union Depot, since railroad restructuring and the decline in passenger traffic led to its closure. Other notable historic structures in Joplin include the Carnegie Library, Fred and Red's Diner, the Frisco Depot, the Scottish Rite Cathedral, and the Crystal Cave (filled in and used for a parking lot). The Newman Mercantile Store has been adapted for use as City Hall. The Fox Theatre has been adapted for use as the Central Christian Center. 

On May 5, 1971, Joplin was struck by a severe tornado, resulting in one death and 50 injuries, along with major damage to many houses and businesses.

On November 11, 1978, Joplin's once-stately Connor Hotel, which was slated for implosion to make way for a new public library, collapsed suddenly and prematurely. Two demolition workers were killed instantly. A third, Alfred Sommers, was trapped for four days, yet survived.

21st century
The city has two major hospitals which serve the Four States region, Freeman Health System and Mercy Hospital Joplin, the latter replacing St. John's Regional Medical Center which was destroyed in the May 22, 2011, tornado. Freeman Hospital East and Landmark Hospital serve more specialized community health needs. A waterfall, Grand Falls, the highest continuously flowing in the state, is on Shoal Creek on the southern end of the city. Included in Schifferdecker Park is the Everett J. Ritchie Tri-State Mineral Museum and Dorothea B. Hoover Historical Museum, which holds a significant collection of minerals from the era of lead and zinc mining in the region.

Numerous buildings in Joplin have been listed on the National Register of Historic Places for their historic and architectural significance. The city has undertaken Agenda 21; a major project to revitalize its Main Street downtown district, which lies on the historic Route 66. It has refurbished building facades, sidewalks, and added old-styled lamp posts, flower baskets, and benches to highlight the historic center of the city.  A gasoline-powered citywide trolley system evokes images of the city's vibrant past.

Numerous trucking lines such as CFI are headquartered in town, as the city is situated near the geographic and population centers of the nation. Eagle-Picher Industries, Tamko Building Products, AT&T Communications, and FAG Bearings are noted employers in Joplin, and Leggett & Platt (a Fortune 500) is located in nearby Carthage. The city is served by the Joplin Regional Airport located north of town near Webb City.

Since the 2011 tornado, the city continued to expand eastward toward I-44. Large-scale development occurred along Range Line Road, particularly around Northpark Mall. Numerous suburbs adjacent to the city include Carl Junction, Webb City, Duenweg, Duquesne, Airport Drive, Oronogo, Carterville, Redings Mill, Shoal Creek Drive, Leawood, and Saginaw.

Due to its location near two major highways and its few event and sports facilities, Joplin attracts travelers and is a destination for conferences and group events. Joplin offers nearly 500 hotel rooms, the majority located within a 1/4-mile area of Range Line Road and I-44. It has the  John Q. Hammons Convention and Trade Center, which serves as the primary event facility for conventions, associations, and large events.

Each June, Joplin hosts the Boomtown Run, a half marathon, 5K, and children's run. The event attracts runners from across the country, and features USTA certified courses which start and end in the historic downtown area. Celebrity runners featured at the prerace banquet have included Bart Yasso, Sarah Reinerston, Suzy Favor-Hamilton, and Jeff Galloway. In 2011, due to the devastating EF5 tornado that struck Joplin on May 22, just three weeks before the run, the event was transformed in the Boomtown Run Day of Service. About 270 individuals registered for the race after the tornado struck, knowing their proceeds would benefit tornado recovery. On June 11, about 270 registered runners and volunteers turned out to help clean debris and sort donations, contributing more than 1,200 hours of service. On August 7, 2012, the Village of Silver Creek and the City of Joplin voted to have Silver Creek annexed into Joplin City limits.

2011 tornado

On May 22, 2011, an EF5 tornado touched down near the western edge of the city among large, newer homes, about 5:21 pm CDT (22:34 UTC) and tracked eastward across the city and across Interstate 44 into rural portions of Newton County. About 2,400 houses, 1,000 cars, and businesses were flattened or blown away in Joplin, particularly in the section between 13th and 32nd Streets across the southern part of the city. The tornado narrowly missed the downtown area.

St. John's Regional Medical Center was damaged, and demolished in 2012. The Missouri Disaster Medical Assistance Team  temporarily replaced the demolished St. John's Regional Medical Center with a mobile hospital until the permanent hospital was rebuilt. The local high school, Joplin High School, was totally destroyed, as well. A total of 161 people died from tornado-related injuries as of the end of July 2011. Communications were lost and power was knocked out to many areas. An official statement from the National Weather Service has categorized the tornado as an EF5. On Sunday, May 29, President Barack Obama, Missouri Governor Jay Nixon, and Federal Emergency Management Agency Director Craig Fugate visited and toured Joplin to see what the damage looked like and attended a memorial service for the deceased. Later that day, the city held a moment of silence at 5:41 pm, to mark the time the tornado struck. The area was declared a federal disaster area.

In July 2011, the City of Joplin entered into a contractual agreement with a master developer company, hired to assist in nearly $3 Billion in reconstruction efforts. Priority construction projects included residential districts and senior and assisted-living facilities; 7,500 residential dwellings in the city were damaged or destroyed by storm. The city council began receiving government funds for additional recovery projects intended to spur expansion and economic growth included the construction of a new and expanded public library and a senior center, among other city amenities of trails, sidewalks, transportation, and park enhancements. A variety of additional major projects were to follow, greatly enhancing and expanding all aspects of the community's development.  City Manager Mark Rohr said, "This effort is the greatest opportunity the city has ever seen." Among other resources and support from governmental agencies, the Economic Development Administration provided $20 million to construct a new Joplin Library and a two-year funding agreement to hire a disaster recovery coordinator to help coordinate the city's nearly $850 million in immediate restoration and recovery efforts.

In the summer of 2012, the United States Housing and Urban Development Department awarded a $45 million community development block grant for reconstruction efforts and in 2013 awarded another $113 million. In May 2013, the Missouri Department of Natural Resources awarded Wildcat Glades Conservation and Audubon Center $500,000 to help with the restoration of the urban forest, which was passed through to the City of Joplin as a subgrant; 1,500 large-calibre trees were planted in the tornado zone and along an urban stream, Joplin Creek.

In May 2016, a summit was held under the name of "Joplin Disaster Recovery Summit". The summit's purpose was to tackle several issues and ensure that the recovery plans take place.

As of March 2018 the only project finished that was proposed in the recovery effort besides the hospital and schools was the new public library. Wallace-Bajjali was sued by a city they formerly contracted with and skipped town without fulfilling the contract made to refurbish Joplin.

Mercy Park was created at the site of the former hospital.

Tourism 

After the May 22, 2011 tornado came through a number of unofficial murals and monuments popped up across the city showcasing the community's spirit to rebuild the city and come back stronger than before. These popups also showcased the beginning of an arts renaissance in Joplin which still can be seen throughout the city today. One of many monuments which popped up was the Rainbow Tree which can be found on 20th Street between Indiana Avenue and Illinois Avenue. The Rainbow Tree is a tree which was destroyed in the May 22, 2011 tornado that the community decorated with bird houses, bird feeders, colored paint, and a sign saying "Help Us Feed The Birds", which is not to be confused with the since fallen Spirit Tree. After the tornado butterflies became a major part of the artistic works in the city due to the stories of children seeing butterfly entities carrying people through the sky shortly after the tornado which spread across the community of Joplin. One of the first works in Joplin to incorporate Butterflies was the "Butterfly Effect: Dreams Take Flight" Mural which is located on the Northwest corner of 15th and Main Street. The piece was painted by Dave Loewenstein with the support of a 20 community member design team and more than 300 community volunteers.

On March 15, 2018, the City of Joplin conducted an independent tourism study which covered the purpose of the study, evaluation process, competitive market summary, recommendations, and implementations. In the overview, the City states its strategic priorities for tourism which were improve the visitor experience, increase the number of visitors, capture visitor spending, and emphasize results-driven tourism marketing. The purpose of the study was to provide direction for Joplin to help define the focus for future tourism efforts. In the study the city mentions the strengths, weaknesses, opportunities, and threats of the tourism market in the region as well as recommendations to increase tourism in the city. One of the recommendations in the study was to develop a conference center with an incorporated or adjacent hotel which could accommodate groups up to 2,500 and include multi-use exhibit space, breakout rooms and the newest technology. Another recommendation was to enhance downtown by encouraging hotel development in downtown, supporting and promoting development of empire market and food culture, supporting development of an Arts & Entertainment complex, supporting efforts of Connect2Culture and the broader art community relating facilities and programs downtown, hosting a variety of special events downtown, promoting downtown as a location for dining, shopping and culture, and continuing Main Street and downtown core improvements. It is recommended that the first step for the CVB Board is to discuss and decide which of the recommendations they see as priorities and take these to City Council for their recommendation. Additionally, the CVB should start collecting visitor data, undertake Identity and Branding study (with the city as lead or in partnership with the city), work on increasing lodging tax, ear-marked for conference center use the Tourism Study as a roadmap for future decision-making.

In September 2019, Joplin unveiled the Rotary Sculpture Garden in Mercy Park which is home to 9 new sculptures with more on the way. The project was a joint effort of Joplin Rotary Club and Joplin Daybreak Rotary Club and all the Sculptures were donated. One by Sharon and Lance Beshore, one by Barbara and Jim Hicklin, and seven by Harry M. Cornell Jr., an art collector and chairman emeritus of Leggett & Platt Inc. On February 7, 2019, the Joplin Rotary Club donated over $9,800 which funded signage at the entrance of the walking paths in Mercy Park. The sculpture garden represents a $200,000 investment by community members who looked for the works of art, bought them, and donated them for permanent display.

The Ghost Light or Spooklight, a mysterious orb spotted by locals and tourists, is also located in the region around Joplin.

Geography
Joplin is the center of what is regionally known as the Four State Area: Oklahoma, Arkansas, Missouri, and Kansas.  Joplin is located north of I-44, its passage to the west into Oklahoma. In recent years, the residential development of Joplin has spread north to Webb City. The historic now-decommissioned U.S. Route 66 passes through Joplin, as 7th Street.

The city is drained by Joplin, Turkey, Silver and Shoal creeks.

Neighborhoods
Roanoke, Arbor Hills, Blendville, Gateway Drive, Iron Gates, Eastmorland, Midway, Murphysburg, North Heights, Oak Pointe, Royal Heights, Silver Creek, Sunnyvale, Sunset Ridge, Westberry Square, and Cedar Ridge are among the many neighborhoods in Joplin.

Climate
Joplin has a humid subtropical climate (Cfa), as defined by the Köppen climate classification system, with cool, dry winters and hot, humid summers; the severe weather season from April through June is the wettest time of year. On average,  52.7 days of + highs, 4.5 days of + highs, 12.5 days where the high fails to rise above freezing, and 1.1 nights of sub- occur per year.

The city is located in Tornado Alley. Notable severe weather events in the past half-century include an F3 tornado in 1971; a tornado in 1973; an EF1 tornado on May 8, 2009; a blizzard on February 1, 2011; and an EF5 tornado on May 22, 2011.

Demographics

As of 2000, the median income for a household in the city was $30,555, and for a family was $38,888. Males had a median income of $28,569 versus $20,665 for females. The per capita income for the city was $17,738. About 10.5% of families and 14.8% of the population were below the poverty line, including 18.8% of those under age 18 and 9.4% of those age 65 or over.

2010 census
As of the 2010 census, 50,150 people, 20,860 households, and 12,212 families resided in the city. The population density was 1,448.4 people per square mile (559.2/km). The 23,322 housing units averaged 678.9 per square mile (262.1/km). The racial makeup of the city is 87.6% White, 3.3% African American, 1.8% Native American, 1.6% Asian, 0.3% Pacific Islander, 1.7 from other races, and 3.6% from two or more races. Hispanics or Latinos of any race were 4.5% of the population.

Of the 20,860 households, 24.6% had children under the age of 18 living with them, 40.1% were married couples living together, 13.5% had a female householder with no husband present, and 41.5% were not families; 29.4% of all households were made up of individuals, and 25.3% had someone living alone who was 65 years of age or older. The average household size was 2.28 and the average family size was 2.89.

In the city, the population was distributed as 24.21% under the age of 19, 9.4% from 20 to 24, 25.12% from 25 to 44, 22.16% from 45 to 64, and 13.18% who were 65 years of age or older. The median age was 35 years. For every 100 females, there were 90.4 males.

Economy

Top employers
According to the city's 2019 Comprehensive Annual Financial Report, the top employers in the city are:

Government
Local government for the City of Joplin is provided through a nine-member city council, whose members are elected by voters citywide, with four seats being assigned to designated geographic zones of the city. City council members include the city's mayor, who is responsible for serving as meeting chair and official spokesman for the city council; and the mayor pro tem, who is responsible for performing the mayor's duties in absence. Both positions are elected every two years by their fellow council members.

Following the June 2020 city elections, the city council members include:
 Doug Lawson [General] (Mayor)
 Keenan Cortez [General] (Mayor Pro Tem)
 Christina Williams [General]
 Kate Spencer [General]
 Josh DeTar [General]
 Gary Shaw [Zone I]
 Chuck Copple [Zone II]
 Phil Stinnett [Zone III]
 Mark Farnham [Zone IV]

Law enforcement services are provided by the Joplin Police Department. On the state-level, the city is represented in the Missouri House of Representatives by Republican Lane Roberts of the 161st District, although a small portion of the city lies within the 162nd District represented by Republican Bob Bromley and in the Missouri Senate by Republican Bill White. The city also lies within Missouri's 7th congressional district, currently represented by Billy Long (R-Springfield).

Education

Primary and secondary education
Joplin is home to 11 public elementary schools in the Joplin R-VIII School District: Cecil Floyd, Columbia, Eastmorland, Irving, Jefferson, Kelsey Norman, McKinley, Royal Heights, Soaring Heights, Stapleton, and West Central. It has three public middle schools, East, North, and South, and one high school, Joplin High School. The first high school was founded in 1885 and was located at the intersection of West 4th Street and Byers Ave. The JHS student population was nearly 2,200 children in the 2008–2009 school year. A school bond issue for $57.4 million was passed in April 2007, allowing the district to build two new middle schools (East and South Middle Schools) to replace the old Memorial and South Middle schools, and to give a major renovation and double the size of North Middle School. Joplin also has many private schools, such as College Heights Christian School, Martin Luther School, Thomas Jefferson Independent Day School, Christ's Community Discovery School, and more. St. Mary's Catholic Elementary School, St. Peter's Middle School, and McAuley Catholic High School are private Catholic schools established in 1885.

Missouri Schools for the Severely Disabled (MSSD) is a state operated program serving Missouri students with severe disabilities in the greater Joplin area at College View State School.

Colleges and universities
The Joplin College of Physicians and Surgeons operated from 1880 to 1884. Today, Joplin is home to Missouri Southern State University, founded in 1937 as a junior college and expanded in the following decades. The one Bible college is Ozark Christian College. Messenger College also operated in Joplin until 2012 when the Pentecostal Church of God moved the campus to Euless, Texas that year.

Kansas City University of Medicine and Biosciences announced in March 2015 its intention to establish a campus in Joplin with a large osteopathic medicine program, to be located in Mercy Hospital-Joplin's former long-term temporary location near the site of the destroyed St. John's Regional Medical Center.
In 2017, KCU took in their first class of future physicians at the Farber-McIntire Campus. The campus is nearly 20,000 square feet and includes a large lecture hall, learning studio and lab dedicated to osteopathic manipulative medicine courses. The school's simulation suite includes 24 standardized patient exam rooms and three simulation rooms featuring high-fidelity, programmable robots in fully equipped medical, surgical, obstetrical and trauma settings. Extended video conferencing capabilities connect the Joplin campus to the KC campus, allowing students, faculty and staff to share learning opportunities. KCU-Joplin also shares a partnership with Freeman Health Systems and Mercy Hospital Joplin.

Joplin is also home to technical schools including Franklin Technology Center, and WTI.

Library
Joplin is served by the Joplin Public Library. In 2013, the Economic Development Administration awarded the city $20 million to relocate the dated library to a new facility along 20th Street, in the heart of the tornado area.  In June 2017, the new 48,000 square foot state-of-the art library opened to the public. Costing nearly $20,000,000, the new facility has meeting and event rooms and spaces, an outdoor plaza and courtyard, children's, teen and adult book collection areas, and maker-spaces and equipment for creative arts and business innovators.

Transportation
Joplin is served by the mainline of the Kansas City Southern (KCS) railroad, as well as by branchlines of the BNSF Railway and Missouri and Northern Arkansas Railroad (MNA). The city was once a beehive of railroad activity; however, many of the original railroad lines serving Joplin, such as the Missouri and North Arkansas Railroad, were abandoned after the demise of the mining and industrial enterprises. The Missouri and North Arkansas had connected Joplin with Helena, Arkansas. Passenger trains have not served the city since the 1960s. The Joplin Union Depot is still intact along the KCS mainline, and efforts are underway to restore it. Despite the decline in some rail lines in and around Joplin during the past five decades, many of the original lines still remain. Aside from the former Frisco Railroad route from Joplin to Webb City and the Carthage to Wichita, Kansas, lines that have since been converted into bike/hike trails, most of the original routes still remain in place under the control of the BNSF, KCS, and M&NA railroad companies.

Interstate 44 connects Joplin with Springfield and St. Louis to the east and Tulsa and Oklahoma City to the west. U.S. Route 71 runs east of the city, connecting Joplin to Kansas City to the north and Fort Smith, Arkansas, to the south. The segment from Kansas City to Joplin was designated Interstate 49 on December 12, 2012.

Range Line Road is the primary north and south commercial district with traffic approaching 25,000 vehicles daily. In 2022 the Range Line Road bridge over Kansas City Southern Railroad line was replaced and made taller and wider to accommodate growth. 

Previously, strong support existed for an extension of Interstate 66 along the current Interstate 44 alignment from St. Louis and extending along the U.S. 400 alignment to Wichita, Kansas, but, despite lobbying by both Missouri and Kansas, the project has been cancelled due to resistance farther east and west along the proposed extended alignment.

Joplin once boasted an extensive trolley and inter-urban rail system. Today, part of the city is served by the Sunshine Lamp Trolley, which commenced service in July 2007, and expanded to three routes in 2009.

In addition, the Joplin Regional Airport provides daily roundtrip flights to Denver international airport and Chicago-O'Hare International Airport operated by United express  as United Airlines.

Notable people

 Tony Alamo, religious evangelist and polygamist
 John Whitby Allen, photographer and model railroading pioneer
 John Beal, actor
 Emily Newell Blair, writer, suffragist, national Democratic Party political leader, a founder of the League of Women Voters and feminist
 Betty Brewer, actress
 Norma Lee Clark, author, private secretary to Woody Allen
 Billy Cook, spree killer
 Robert Cummings, actor, star of films and television's The Bob Cummings Show
 Pauline Donnan, opera singer
 Christofer Drew, musician
 Scott Elbert, Major League Baseball pitcher
 Jane Grant, co-founder of The New Yorker magazine
 Langston Hughes, poet and writer, for whom Langston Hughes Broadway in Joplin is named
 Hale Irwin, golfer, three-time U.S. Open champion
 H. Dale Jackson, Baptist minister and ethicist, lived in Joplin with his wife when they were newly married in 1949
 Jack Jewsbury, former player and captain of the Portland Timbers of Major League Soccer
 Tito Landrum, baseball player
 Jamie McMurray, NASCAR driver
 Charles McPherson, jazz musician
 Elva Miller, singer
 Victor J. Miller, 33rd Mayor of St. Louis
 Lisa Myers, broadcast journalist
 J. Eddie Peck, actor, was raised in Joplin, graduated from Parkwood High School
 Charles Plumb, cartoonist of the syndicated Ella Cinders comic strip
 Carl Pomerance, mathematician
 Darrell Porter, baseball player, World Series champion and 4-time All-Star
 Vance Powell, Grammy winning record producer.
 Mel Purcell, tennis player
 Pattiann Rogers, poet
 Wayne Shanklin, music producer and songwriter
 Frank Shellenback, baseball pitcher in Pacific Coast League Hall of Fame
 Pauline Starke, silent-film actress
 Gabby Street, manager of the St. Louis Cardinals; adopted Joplin as his hometown
 William Tobin, journalist
 Dennis Weaver, actor, star of films and television's Gunsmoke and McCloud
 Percy Wenrich, composer
 Grant Wistrom, former NFL defensive end, Super Bowl champion with St. Louis Rams

References

External links

 
 City of Joplin
 Historic Joplin – website on Joplin history.
 Historic maps of Joplin in the Sanborn Maps of Missouri Collection at the University of Missouri

 
Cities in Jasper County, Missouri
Cities in Newton County, Missouri
Cities in Missouri
Joplin, Missouri, metropolitan area
Populated places established in 1873
1873 establishments in Missouri